Prakash Rasaili is a Nepalese politician, belonging to the Nepali Congress currently serving as the member of the 1st Federal Parliament of Nepal. In the 2017 Nepalese general election, he was elected as a proportional representative from Dalit category.

References

Nepal MPs 2017–2022
Living people
Nepali Congress politicians from Sudurpashchim Province
1975 births